prototype 180 is an artwork by American conceptual artist Mary Ellen Carroll who lives and works in New York City and Houston. prototype 180 is "the centerpiece of Carroll's Innovation Territories, an initiative co-sponsored by the Rice University Building Institute. prototype 180 is located at 6513 Sharpsview Drive, Houston. Houston was self-selected itself as the site of the artwork because it lacks an official land-use policy.

The artwork "will make architecture performative." It is literally a ground-shifting exercise, because it structurally involves the rotation, back to front, of a single-family, ranch-style house and its surrounding land in the development of Sharpstown, a suburb of Houston, Texas.

Following the rotation, the structure will be retrofitted and rehabilitated to become an occupied structure that will become an institute for the study of considered urbanism. In planning for 10 years, prototype 180 is described as "reconsideration of monumentality that combines live performance, sculpture, architecture and technology."

External links

References

Conceptual art
Public art in the United States